This is the discography of British post-punk/new wave band the Monochrome Set.

Albums

Studio albums

Live albums

Compilation albums

Video albums

Singles

Notes

References

Discographies of British artists
Rock music group discographies
New wave discographies